The Chinese Ambassador to Nicaragua is the official representative of the People's Republic of China to the Republic of Nicaragua since 2021, after Nicaragua switched diplomatic ties from Taiwan to China.

Both countries had diplomatic ties between 1985 and 1990 before Nicaragua switched diplomatic ties from China to Taiwan.

List of representatives

Nicaragua
China